is a Japanese four-panel manga series by Tsukasa Unohana. It was serialized in Houbunsha's seinen manga magazine Manga Time Kirara Carat from its April 2016 to October 2020 issues and has been collected in five tankōbon volumes. An anime television series adaptation by Doga Kobo aired from October 7 to December 23, 2018.

Plot
The story focuses on Kohane Hatoya, a girl who is constantly helping others. Taking an interest in cheerleading, Kohane decides to start up her own Cheer Club upon entering her freshman year at Kaminoki High School, recruiting her best friend Uki Sawatari and veteran cheerleader Hizume Arima.

Characters

A peppy girl who constantly comes to the help whenever someone is in trouble, often getting hurt in the process. She takes a strong interest in cheerleading, despite having a fear of heights from her childhood.

A veteran cheerleader who was thrown out of her old cheer squad for being too good. She is convinced by Kohane to take up cheerleading again, but often worries about ending up alone again.

Kohane's childhood friend who is often worried about her safety when she tries to help people. Pleased to find she has found something to do for herself, Uki supports Kohane's interest and joins her Cheer Club.

Kohane's classmate, who often lacks confidence and is embarrassed about her strong sounding name.

A twin-tailed girl who keeps an eye on the Cheer Club from a long distance.

Kohane's homeroom teacher.

Kohane's classmate and Kotetsu's best friend. Kon is a lesbian who is able to successfully confess to her crush thanks to the Cheer Club's help.

The captain of the Basketball Club who has a boyish appearance.

Media

Manga
Anima Yell! began as a four-panel manga series written and illustrated by Tsukasa Unohana, which was serialized in Houbunsha's seinen manga magazine Manga Time Kirara Carat from February 2016 to August 2020. The series' chapters have been compiled into five tankōbon volumes published by Houbunsha as of September 25, 2020.

Anime
An anime television series adaptation produced by Doga Kobo aired from October 7 to December 23, 2018, on AT-X, Tokyo MX, and BS11. The anime is directed by Masako Sato, with scripts penned by Fumihiko Shimo and character designs handled by Manamu Amasaki. Crunchyroll streamed the series. The series ran for 12 episodes.

Video game
Characters from the series appear alongside other Manga Time Kirara characters in the 2018 mobile RPG, Kirara Fantasia.

Music
Opening Theme
Jump Up↑Yell!! by Kaminoki High School Cheerleading Club (Yuka Ozaki)
Insert Song
CRAZY GONNA CRAZY by YURiKA (Episode 11)
One Day by MB Padfield (Episode 12)

Notes

Reception
Anime News Network had five editors review the first episode of the anime: Nick Creamer found the humor "too mild and one-note" to illicit any laughter and the characterization of Kohane and Arima feeling "underwritten" but gave credit to the aesthetic work of both the backgrounds and facial expressions, and the jokes having effective sound design to emphasize them; Theron Martin was mixed about Kohane's overall character, saying she can be grating at times and misinterpret things heard but admired her for having tons of enthusiasm and heart to be proactive in conquering her fears and being a motivational voice towards Arima's low self-worth as a cheerleader; James Beckett was critical of Kohane's obnoxious persistence to make friends with Arima and start a cheerleading club but felt that character quirk will be fixed in later episodes to deliver on both its slice-of-life and sports content with decent cheerleading animation and cutesy antics, saying it will be "perfectly acceptable candy-coated fluff" for its target audience; Paul Jensen agreed with Beckett's sentiments towards Kohane's overly upbeat personality being an annoyance and criticized the repetitious and over-explanation of its characters throughout the episode. The fifth reviewer, Rebecca Silverman, also echoed what both Beckett and Jensen said about Kohane but was optimistic that she'll grow up into a more tolerable character as the series continues, concluding that "In the meantime, this feels like a slightly more exciting Cute Girls Doing Cute Things show than we normally get; in fact, it may be a full-out sports show, although I'm inclined to think it'll land somewhere in the middle. The animation for the dancing looks smooth and the characters are all distinct and distinctly cute, so if you can handle Kohane's constant barrage, this episode makes it look like Anima Yell! could be very appealing."

References

External links
  
 

Anime series based on manga
Cheerleading television series
Crunchyroll anime
Doga Kobo
Houbunsha manga
Medialink
Sports anime and manga
Seinen manga
Toho Animation
Yonkoma